Beccari's margareta rat (Margaretamys beccarii) is a species of rodent in the family Muridae. It is endemic to the island of Sulawesi in Indonesia.

References

Margaretamys
Rodents of Sulawesi
Mammals described in 1880
Taxonomy articles created by Polbot